This article is about the particular significance of the year 1811 to Wales and its people.

Incumbents

Lord Lieutenant of Anglesey – Henry Paget 
Lord Lieutenant of Brecknockshire and Monmouthshire – Henry Somerset, 6th Duke of Beaufort
Lord Lieutenant of Caernarvonshire – Thomas Bulkeley, 7th Viscount Bulkeley
Lord Lieutenant of Cardiganshire – Thomas Johnes
Lord Lieutenant of Carmarthenshire – George Rice, 3rd Baron Dynevor 
Lord Lieutenant of Denbighshire – Sir Watkin Williams-Wynn, 5th Baronet    
Lord Lieutenant of Flintshire – Robert Grosvenor, 1st Marquess of Westminster 
Lord Lieutenant of Glamorgan – John Stuart, 1st Marquess of Bute 
Lord Lieutenant of Merionethshire - Sir Watkin Williams-Wynn, 5th Baronet
Lord Lieutenant of Montgomeryshire – Edward Clive, 1st Earl of Powis
Lord Lieutenant of Pembrokeshire – Richard Philipps, 1st Baron Milford
Lord Lieutenant of Radnorshire – George Rodney, 3rd Baron Rodney

Bishop of Bangor – Henry Majendie 
Bishop of Llandaff – Richard Watson
Bishop of St Asaph – William Cleaver 
Bishop of St Davids – Thomas Burgess

Events
5 February - The Prince of Wales becomes Prince Regent.
25 March - Sir Joseph Bailey takes over Nantyglo Ironworks.
25 May - The Hay Railway is authorised by an Act of Parliament.
19 June - The first Methodist Association for the ordination of new ministers is held at Llandeilo. Thomas Charles plays a leading role. The Presbyterian Church of Wales thus secedes from the Church of England.
20 August - Thomas Sheasby resigns as engineer of the Aberdare Canal, to be replaced by George Overton. As part of the canal works, a free-standing metal rail bridge is built at Robertstown, Aberdare - the first of its kind in the world.
17 September - Completion of The Cob embankment across Traeth Mawr by William Madocks is celebrated. His nearby model town of Tremadog is also completed by this year.
date unknown
At Hereford Assizes, Samuel Homfray and his partners in the Penydarren ironworks sue the Dowlais Company for fouling the Morlais brook with cinders and slag.
Pont-y-gwaith is built over the River Taff near Merthyr Tydfil.

Arts and literature

New books

English language
Thomas Charles - Biblical Dictionary, vol. 4
Richard Fenton - A Tour in Quest of Genealogy
Ann Hatton - Poetic Trifles
Peter Roberts - Brut Tysilio (English translation)

Welsh language
Thomas Evans (Tomos Glyn Cothi) - Cyfansoddiad o Hymnau
John Williams (ed.) - Gwaith Prydyddawl … W. Williams

Music
John James - Pigion o Hymnau

Births
14 January - Rowland Prichard, musician (d. 1887)
26 January - Roger Edwards, minister (d. 1886)
11 March - Thomas Jones (Glan Alun), poet (d. 1866)
12 March - Mary Pendrill Llewelyn, translator and writer (died 1874)
7 April - John Williams (Ab Ithel), antiquary (d. 1862)
29 May - Charles Meredith, pioneer grazier and politician in Tasmania (died 1880 in Australia)
25 June - Jane Hughes, poet (died 1880)
11 July - William Robert Grove, inventor (d. 1896)
date unknown - John Jones (Shoni Sguborfawr), Rebecca rioter (died 1858)

Deaths
1 May - Titus Lewis, Baptist minister and writer, 38
30 May - Nicholas Owen, priest and antiquarian, 59
4 July - Mariamne Johnes, botanist, 27
25 September - Joshua Eddowes, printer and bookseller, 87
3 October - Sir John Stepney, 8th Baronet, politician, 68

References

 
 Wales